Blacknut is a French video game company that specializes in cloud gaming. It hosts a cloud gaming service with dedicated servers to run console and mobile games for play. Publishers that are currently supporting the service include Konami, Square Enix, Gameloft, Crytek, and Embracer Group.

References

Cloud gaming services